Muscone is an organic compound that is the primary contributor to the odor of musk.

The chemical structure of muscone was first elucidated by Leopold Ružička. It consists of a 15-membered ring ketone with one methyl substituent in the 3-position. It is an oily liquid that is found naturally as the (−)-enantiomer, (R)-3-methylcyclopentadecanone. Muscone has been synthesized as the pure (−)-enantiomer as well as the racemate. It is very slightly soluble in water and miscible with alcohol.

Natural muscone is obtained from musk, a glandular secretion of the musk deer, which has been used in perfumery and medicine for thousands of years. Since obtaining natural musk requires killing the endangered animal, nearly all muscone used in perfumery today is synthetic. It has the characteristic smell of being "musky".

One asymmetric synthesis of (−)-muscone begins with commercially available (+)-citronellal, and forms the 15-membered ring via ring-closing metathesis:

A more recent enantioselective synthesis involves an intramolecular aldol addition/dehydration reaction of a macrocyclic diketone. Muscone is now produced synthetically for use in perfumes and for scenting consumer products.

Isotopologues of muscone have been used in a study of the mechanism of olfaction. Global replacement of all hydrogens in muscone was achieved by heating muscone with Rh/C in D2O at 150 °C. It was found that the human musk-recognizing receptor, OR5AN1, identified using a heterologous olfactory receptor expression system and robustly responding to muscone, fails to distinguish between muscone and the so-prepared isotopologue in vitro. OR5AN1 is reported to bind to muscone and related musks such as civetone through hydrogen-bond formation from tyrosine-258 along with hydrophobic interactions with surrounding aromatic residues in the receptor.

See also 
 Civetone

References 

Flavors
Perfume ingredients
Macrocycles
Ketones